is a 1982 Japanese comedy film directed by Yoji Yamada. It stars Kiyoshi Atsumi as Torajirō Kuruma (Tora-san), and Yūko Tanaka as his love interest or "Madonna". Tora-san, the Expert is the thirtieth entry in the popular, long-running Otoko wa Tsurai yo series. This became the first Tora-san film to be released on DVD with English subtitles in 16:9 ratio when the Hong Kong label Panorama did so in 2006.

Synopsis
Tora-san gets into an argument with his uncle and sets out on the road again. In Kyushu he meets a young woman named Keiko and the shy zoologist Saburō, and attempts to play matchmaker between the two when they all return to Tokyo.

Cast
 Kiyoshi Atsumi as Torajirō
 Chieko Baisho as Sakura
 Yūko Tanaka as Keiko
 Kenji Sawada as Saburō
 Masami Shimojō as Kuruma Tatsuzō
 Chieko Misaki as Tsune Kuruma (Torajiro's aunt)
 Gin Maeda as Hiroshi Suwa
 Hisao Dazai as Boss (Umetarō Katsura)
 Gajirō Satō as Genkō
 Hidetaka Yoshioka as Mitsuo Suwa
 Asao Utada as Katsuzō Muta
 Miyuki Kojima as Yukari Nomura
 Haruko Mabuchi as Kinuko

Critical appraisal
Kiyoshi Atsumi, the star of the Otoko wa Tsurai yo series won the Best Actor prize at the Blue Ribbon Awards for his role in Tora-san, the Expert. Co-star Yūko Tanaka was nominated for Best Actress at the Japan Academy Prize. The casting of Kenji Sawada, then one of Japan's most flamboyant rock stars, as the painfully shy Saburo, also drew attention.

Stuart Galbraith IV judges this film to be one of the best in the series, helped by Tanaka's outstanding performance. The German-language site molodezhnaja gives Tora-san, the Expert three and a half out of five stars.

Availability
Tora-san, the Expert was released theatrically on December 28, 1982. In Japan, the film was released on videotape in 1986 and 1996, and in DVD format in 2005 and 2008.

References

Bibliography

English

German

Japanese

External links
 Tora-san, the Expert at www.tora-san.jp (official site)

1982 films
Films directed by Yoji Yamada
1982 comedy films
1980s Japanese-language films
Otoko wa Tsurai yo films
Shochiku films
Films with screenplays by Yôji Yamada
Japanese sequel films
1980s Japanese films